These are the official results of the Men's Mountainbike Race at the 1996 Summer Olympics in Atlanta. There were a total number of 43 participants, with seven non-finishers, in this inaugural Olympic event over 47.7 kilometres, held on July 30, 1996.

Final classification

See also
 Women's Cross Country Race

References

External links
 Official Report

Cycling at the 1996 Summer Olympics
Cycling at the Summer Olympics – Men's cross-country
1996 in mountain biking
Men's events at the 1996 Summer Olympics